Aap Ke Deewane is a 1980 Indian Hindi-language romance film, produced by Vimal Kumar under the Film Krafts banner, presented by Rakesh Roshan and directed by Surendera Mohan. It stars Rishi Kapoor, Rakesh Roshan and Tina Munim, while Jeetendra has given a guest appearance and the music was composed by Rajesh Roshan.

The film is Rakesh Roshan's first attempt at production, going forward he produced and directed films. Rishi Kapoor and Jeetendra being off-screen friends of his, he had a song put in to ensure that the three get together on screen too, as Jeetendra did not have a role in the film and is present only in the song.

Rakesh Roshan's son Hrithik Roshan, who was six years old at the time of filming the movie, appears briefly in Aap Ke Deewane as the child-version of the character otherwise played by his father, sharing his tricycle with another child on a beach.

Plot
Ram (Rishi Kapoor) and Rahim (Rakesh Roshan) are inseparable childhood friends. They complete their schooling and enroll in a hostel to complete their education. They get enrolled in a college for further education where they excel in studies. This does not augur well with their fellow collegian, Kundan (Ranjeet), who has them framed for sexually molesting a female, whereby both get rusticated from the college. With no other means to survive, both assume the identity of a male and female and get employed as tutors to Sameera (Tina Munim), the commonly adopted daughter of multi-millionaires Inshallah Khan (Ashok Kumar) and retired Colonel, Thakur Vikramjit Singh (Pran). Eventually, both fall in love with Sameera with each wanting her for himself, but it is up to Sameera to choose her prospective life partner.

Cast
 Rishi Kapoor as Ram
 Rakesh Roshan as Rahim
 Jeetendra as Rocky (Guest Appearance)
 Tina Munim as Sameera
 Shoma Anand as Meena
 Ashok Kumar as Inshallah Khan
 Pran as Thakur Vikramjeet Singh
 Deven Verma as Butler
 Ranjeet as Kundan
 Keshto Mukherjee as Lawyer
 Pinchoo Kapoor as Judge
 Sudhir Dalvi
 Gulshan Bawra
 Yusuf Khan as Yusuf
 Hrithik Roshan: (uncredited) boy, as young Rahim, sharing his tricycle with the young Ram on a beach during the one-shot flashback of how the two characters originally met, in the song "Ram Kare Allah Kare"

Soundtrack
Mohammed Rafi sang all the songs of the movie besides Lata Mangeshkar, Kishore Kumar and Amit Kumar. In this movie, Mohammed Rafi did playback for all the male characters - Rishi Kapoor, Rakesh Roshan and Jeetendra in three different songs. Lyrics by Anand Bakshi.

External links 
 

1979 films
1970s Hindi-language films
Films scored by Rajesh Roshan